Immunology is the study of the immune system during health and disease. Below is a list of immunology-related articles.

A

B

C

D

E

F

G

H

I

J

K

L

M

N

O

P

R

S

T

U

V

W

X 

 
Immunology